The 2018 SAFF Championship, also known as 2018 SAFF Suzuki Cup for sponsorship reasons, was the 12th edition of the SAFF Championship, the biennial international men's football championship of South Asia organized by SAFF. It was initially scheduled to be hosted by Bangladesh in December 2017, but later rescheduled to 4–15 September 2018.

Host selection
On 2 January 2016, SAFF executive committee made a decision that Bangladesh would host the 2017 SAFF Championship at a meeting held in Trivandrum, India. Maldives and Bhutan made bids to host the games but the latter withdrew its bid.

This was the third SAFF Championship hosted by Bangladesh, after victory in the 2003 edition and semi finalists in 2009.

The draw ceremony was held on 18 April 2018 in Dhaka.

Participating nations

Squads

Venue

Officials

Referees

 Rowan Arumughan
 Hasan Akrami
 Mohammad Arafah
 Hettikamkanamge Perera
 Hanna Hattab
 Sivakorn Pu-udom

Assistant Referees

 Manir Ahmmad Dali
 Sapam Kennedy
 Hassan Zeheiri
 Priyanga Palliya Guruge
 Apichit Nophuan
 Ali Mohammed Al Hasani

Group stage

Group A

Group B

Knockout phase

Bracket

Semi-finals

Final

Champion

Awards
The following awards were given for the 2018 SAFF Championship.

Goalscorers

Media coverage

References

External links

Official website

2018 SAFF Championship
2018 in Asian football
2018 in Bangladeshi football
2018
2018
September 2018 sports events in Asia